Igor Avrunin (sometimes spelled Igor Avronin; , 16 July 1957 – 7 January 2020) was a USSR-born Israeli track and field athlete. 

He set Israeli record in the men's discus throw on 1 June 1991 at 62.24 m and in the men's shot put on 22 June 1991 at 19.09 m. He is still the current Israeli record holder.

Igor Avrunin emigrated to Israel in 1990.

Avrunin participated in the 1991 World Championship in Tokyo and the 1991 IAAF World Indoor Championships in Seville, Spain.

See also 
 List of Israeli records in athletics

References 

1957 births
2020 deaths
People from Gomel
Israeli athletes
Israeli male shot putters
Israeli male discus throwers
Olympic athletes of Israel
Israeli people of Belarusian-Jewish descent